Shatsk is a town and the administrative center of Shatsky District in Ryazan Oblast, Russia, located on the Shacha River (Tsna's tributary)  southeast of Ryazan, the administrative center of the oblast. Population:

History
In the 16th century, the so-called Shatsk Gates was a strip of open land through the forest useful for Tatar raids that the Russians had to fortify. Shatsk proper was founded in 1553 as a military outpost for defending the southern borders of the Grand Duchy of Moscow. It was granted town status by Catherine the Great in 1779.

Administrative and municipal status
Within the framework of administrative divisions, Shatsk serves as the administrative center of Shatsky District. As an administrative division, it is incorporated within Shatsky District as the town of district significance of Shatsk. As a municipal division, the town of district significance of Shatsk is incorporated within Shatsky Municipal District as Shatskoye Urban Settlement.

Economy
Town industries include vodka production and a meat packing plant.

References

Notes

Sources

Cities and towns in Ryazan Oblast
Shatsky Uyezd
Populated places established in 1553
1553 establishments in Russia